NSC 162/2 was a policy paper of the United States National Security Council approved by President Dwight D. Eisenhower on 30 October 1953 which defined the Cold War national security policy during the Eisenhower administration. NSC162/2 was based upon NSC162, which was the final synthesis of the task force reports of Project Solarium. On 7 January 1955, NSC162/2 was superseded by NSC5501.

Massive retaliation
NSC162/2 stated that the United States needs to maintain "a strong military posture, with emphasis on the capability of inflicting massive retaliatory damage by offensive striking power", and that, in the event of hostilities, the United States "will consider nuclear weapons as available for use as other munitions."

See also 
Massive retaliation
Deterrence theory
Project Solarium
NSC 68

References

External links 
NSC 162/2 original document
NSC 162/2, digitized version by the Office of the Historian

Cold War history of the United States
Nuclear history of the United States
United States defense policymaking
Presidency of Dwight D. Eisenhower
United States documents
Classified documents
1953 documents
United States national security directives